Stade Banfora is a multi-use stadium in Banfora, Burkina Faso.  It is currently used mostly for football matches and is the home stadium of Union Sportive de la Comoé.  The stadium holds 6,000 people.

References 

Banfora